Johnny Algreen Petersen (born 28 September 1948) is a Danish rower. He competed in the men's coxless four event at the 1968 Summer Olympics.

References

1948 births
Living people
Danish male rowers
Olympic rowers of Denmark
Rowers at the 1968 Summer Olympics
Rowers from Copenhagen